is a railway station in the city of Tamura, Fukushima Prefecture, Fukushima Prefecture, Japan, operated by East Japan Railway Company (JR East).

Lines

Station layout
The station has a single island platform connected to the station building by a level crossing. The station is unstaffed.

Platforms

History
Kanameta Station opened on January 1, 1950. The station was absorbed into the JR East network upon the privatization of the Japanese National Railways (JNR) on April 1, 1987. On March 11, 1989, it became fully automated and on March 3, 2009, started accepting the Suica card.

Surrounding area

 Kanameta Post Office
 Kanameta Onsen

See also
 List of Railway Stations in Japan

References

External links

 

Stations of East Japan Railway Company
Railway stations in Fukushima Prefecture
Ban'etsu East Line
Railway stations in Japan opened in 1950
Tamura, Fukushima